Kalem is a surname. Notable people with the surname include: 

Mohamed Amine Kalem (born 1982), Italian-Tunisian para table tennis player
Toni Kalem (born 1956), American actress, screenwriter and director